Kristali (trans. The Crystals) are a Serbian pop rock band from Belgrade.

History

1990s 
The band was formed in January 1993, by bassist and vocalist Dejan Gvozden and guitarist Željko Markuš, who, having performed blues and rock standards in Belgrade cafes, were joined by drummer Dejan Kostić. By the time the band had written their first hit song "Dva metra" ("Two Meters"), for which the music video was directed by Milutin Petrović, they had already featured a new bassist Milan Popović, thus leaving Gvozden on the vocal position only. The band was further expanded with the arrival of the former Del Arno Band member Nenad Potije on trombone. During the same year, the band had their first recording, the song "O kako si lepa" ("Oh, How Beautiful You Are"), released on the L.V.O. Records various artists compilation Academia vol.1, and the live version of the song, recorded at the Belgrade club Prostor on February 9, 1994, appeared on the 1995 live various artists compilation Groovanje vol. 1.<ref>[http://www.discogs.com/Various-Gruvanje-Live-Vol-1/release/2067097 Groovanje vol. 1 at Discogs]</ref>

The debut album Kristali (The Crystals), released by L.V.O. Records in 1994, featured guest appearances by Eyesburn frontman Nemanja Kojić (trombone), Borivoje Borac (saxophone), Vladimir Lešić (percussion), Đorđe Vasović (keyboards) and Dža ili Bu member Aleksadar Mitanovski, who played the guitar solo on the track "Emili" ("Emily"). The album, recorded at the Belgrade Akademija studio from March until June 1994, was produced by Goran Živković "Žika" and Rodoljub Stojanović, and the album cover was designed by Goranka Matić. Through the notable songs "Dva metra" ("Two Meters"), "O kako si lepa", "Znam" ("I Know") and "Osmi dan" ("The Eighth Day"), the latter two being released on a double A-side 7" single, the band promoted pop structured songs up-to-date with the current Britpop trends in Great Britain. Available on compact cassette only, the album was quickly sold out and is today a rarity and a collector's item.

The second studio album, Dolina ljubavi (The Valley of Love), released in April 1997 and produced by Igor Borojević, featured guest appearances by Block Out member Aleksandar Balać (bass), Aleksandar Tomić (saxophone), and Rambo Amadeus, who played acoustic guitar on the track "Sad se svega sećam" ("Now I Remember Everything"). The songs "Talasi" ("The Waves"), "Novi dan" ("New Day"), and "Hajde, hajde" ("Come On") followed the same musical patterns found on the debut. The following year, the band recorded the soundtrack for the theatre play Furka, and in 1999, the band appeared on the various artists cover album Korak napred 2 koraka nazad (A Step Forward 2 Steps Backwards), with the cover version of the song "Baby, baby", originally written by Srđan Šaper, and performed by the fictional band VIS Simboli in the Slobodan Šijan 1984 movie Davitelj protiv davitelja (Strangler Versus Strangler).

 2000s 
In 2001, the band released their third studio album Sve što dolazi (All That Is To Come) featuring new members, bassist Aleksandar Šišić and drummer Bojan Dmitrašinović, whereas Gvozden, beside the vocal duties, also became the rhythm guitarist. Ten new songs, all written by Gvozden and Markuš, including the notable "Ustani, kreni" ("Stand Up, Go"), "Menjam se" ("I am Changing") and "Moje srce" ("My Heart"), were produced by Mirko Vukomanović. The following year, the band appeared on two Metropolis Records various artists compilations: the song "Sad se svega sećam" appeared on the Metropolis vol.1, "Ti si sa drugoga sveta" ("You Are From Another World") appeared on Metropolis vol.2. The remix of the song "Ustani, kreni" edited by the electronic band Intruder appeared on the Intruder 2002 album Collector's Item.

The recording of the song "Tvoje pismo" ("Your Letter"), recorded at the Dejan Cukić & Spori Ritam Band November 16, 2002 Sava Centar concert, featuring Gvozden and Markuš, was released in 2003 on the Dejan Cukić & Spori Ritam Band live album DC & SRB @ SC by BK Sound. During the same year, the lineup featuring Gvozden, Markuš, bassist Dejan Škopelja, drummer Ratko Ljubičić and keyboardist Ivan Krstić celebrated the tenth anniversary of the band existence at a live performance held at the Belgrade studio VI. The recording of the performance was released on the 2004 live album Live @ studio 6, featuring rearranged versions of the songs recorded during the first decade. During the same year, the band recorded the single "Mesto za nas" ("A Place for Us"), which appeared on the Sivi kamion crvene boje (The Red Colored Grey Truck) movie soundtrack.

In 2006, Gvozden appeared on the popular Hello Juice commercial, dressed as a wolf and doing the impersonation of the Three Little Pigs story, and in 2009, Multimedia records reissued the compilation Groovanje devedesete uživo, featuring the live recording of the song "O kako si lepa". During the same year, on April, the lineup Gvozden, Markuš, bassist Marko Orlović and drummer Ernest Džananović recorded the single "Vreme je" ("It Is Time") in order to promote the upcoming album of the same name. The single appeared on the 26th place of the webzine Popboks single of the year 2009 list.

 2010s 
In October 2010, the single "Drvoseča" ("The Woodcutter"), a cover of the Crveni Koralji version of Tim Hardin's "If I Were a Carpenter", from Kristali upcoming album appeared on the 5th place of the Jelen Top 10 list for two weeks. The single remained in the Top 10 for five weeks. "Drvoseča" also appeared on the Žena sa slomljenim nosem (A Broken Nosed Woman) movie soundtrack. In March 2013, Kristali released their fourth studio album, Samo bluz (Only Blues). The album, announced with the title track, was released through PGP-RTS, and was available for free listening at Bandcamp.

In June 2014, the band released the single "Divan dan" ("Beautiful Day"), announcing their new studio album. In October 2014, the band celebrated their 20th anniversary with a concert in Belgrade Youth Center. The concert featured guest appearances by the band's former members Milan Popović and Željko Markuš.

 Legacy 
In 2006, the song "Osmi dan" was ranked No. 74 on the B92 Top 100 Domestic Songs list.

 Discography 
 Studio albums Kristali (1994)Dolina ljubavi (1997)Sve što dolazi (2001)Samo bluz (2013)

 Live albums Live @ Studio 6 (2004)

 Singles 
"Znam" / "Osmi dan"' (1994)

 Other appearances 
"Kako si lepa" (Academia vol. 1; 1993)
"Kako si lepa" (Groovanje vol. 1; 1995)
"Baby, baby" (Korak napred 2 koraka nazad; 1999)
"Ustani, kreni (Josh samo malo Intruder edit)" (Intruder - Collector's item; 2002)
"Kako si lepa" (Groovanje devedesete uživo; 2009)

 References 

 EX YU ROCK enciklopedija 1960-2006'', Janjatović Petar;

External links 
 Kristali at Myspace
 Kristali at Facebook
 Kristali at YouTube
 Kristali at Discogs
 Kristali at Last.fm
 Kristali at Rateyourmusic
 Kristali at B92.fm

 

Serbian rock music groups
Serbian pop rock music groups
Musical groups from Belgrade
Musical groups established in 1993
1993 establishments in Yugoslavia